Ismaël Bamba (born November 10, 1987 in Côte d'Ivoire) is a Canadian football wide receiver for the Montreal Alouettes of the Canadian Football League. He was selected 39th overall by the Saskatchewan Roughriders in the 2012 CFL Draft. After the 2011 CIS season, he was ranked as the 11th best player in the Canadian Football League’s Amateur Scouting Bureau final rankings for players eligible in the 2012 CFL Draft, and sixth by players in Canadian Interuniversity Sport. He played CIS football with the Sherbrooke Vert et Or. He also played for the St. Leonard Cougars of the CJFL and for the University of North Dakota Fighting Sioux.

References

1987 births
Living people
Canadian football wide receivers
Edmonton Elks players
Montreal Alouettes players
Players of Canadian football from Quebec
Saskatchewan Roughriders players
Sherbrooke Vert et Or football players
North Dakota Fighting Hawks football players
Ivorian emigrants to Canada